The Yakhta (Russian: , literally Yacht) is a satellite bus designed and manufactured by Khrunichev. It is a small unpressurized bus low Earth Orbit to medium Earth orbit to GEO. It has four different generations and its different versions have been used from civilian communications to satellite navigation.

Satellites

Launched
Monitor-E
KazSat-1
KazSat-2
Ekspress MD1
Ekspress MD2

See also
 Khrunichev – Designer and manufacturer of the platform.

References

External links
Khrunichev's Yakhta Bus

Satellite buses

Communications satellites
Satellites of Russia